Richard Wright (c. 1568–1639), MP of Sherborne, Dorset, was a Member (MP) of the Parliament of England for Dorchester in 1597 and for Queenborough.

Family
Richard Wright was the eldest son of Robert Wright of Sturminster Newton, Dorset. He was educated at Sherborne, Magdalen College, Oxford and New College, Oxford.

He was a Member (MP) of the Parliament of England for Dorchester in 1597 and for Queenborough in 1604. He was Mayor of Lyme Regis in 1617–18.

References

1568 births
1639 deaths
People educated at Sherborne School
Members of the Parliament of England for Dorchester
English MPs 1597–1598
English MPs 1604–1611
People from Sherborne
Mayors of places in Dorset